Richard Butler (April 1, 1743 – November 4, 1791) was an officer in the Continental Army during the American Revolutionary War who was later killed while he was fighting Native Americans in the United States in a battle that is known as St. Clair's Defeat.

Family
Born in St. Bridget's Parish, Dublin, Ireland, Richard Butler was the oldest son of Thomas and Eleanor (Parker) Butler. Thomas Butler was an Irish aristocrat who served in the British army. He was the brother of Colonel Thomas Butler and Captain Edward Butler.  All three brothers served in the American Revolution and in the Northwest Indian War against the Western Confederacy of Native American tribes in the Northwest Territories.  His two other brothers, William and Percival, served in the Revolution but did not see later military service.

Early life
In 1748 Butler's father opened a gun shop in Dublin, but that same year the family moved to Lancaster, Pennsylvania, where he learned to make the Pennsylvania long rifles used in the French and Indian War.

By 1760, the family had moved to the frontier at Carlisle, Pennsylvania, where Thomas and his sons manufactured long rifles and became friends with Daniel Morgan.  The Butler gun shop still stands in Carlisle.

By the 1770s, Richard Butler and his brother William were important traders at Fort Pitt in Pennsylvania and in Ohio. A street in Pittsburgh, Butler Street, is named for them.

American Revolution
At the outset of the American Revolution, the Continental Congress named Richard Butler a commissioner in 1775 to negotiate with the Indians.  He visited representatives of the Delaware, Shawnee, and other tribes to secure their support, or at least neutrality, in the war with Britain.

On July 20, 1776, Butler was commissioned a major in the 8th Pennsylvania Regiment in the Continental Army, serving first as second in command to his friend Daniel Morgan.  He was promoted to lieutenant colonel on March 12, 1777 retroactive to September 1776.  On June 7, 1777 he was promoted to colonel and placed in command of 9th Pennsylvania Regiment.

During the war he saw action at the Battle of Saratoga (1777) and the Battle of Monmouth (1778). His four other brothers also served, and were noted for their bravery as the "fighting Butlers".

In January 1781 he was transferred to the 5th Pennsylvania and lead the Continental Army at the Battle of Spencer's Ordinary.

At the conclusion of the Battle of Yorktown in October 1781, General George Washington conferred on Richard Butler the honor of receiving Cornwallis' sword of surrender, an honor which Richard gave to his second in command, Ebenezer Denny.  At the last moment, Baron von Steuben demanded that he receive the sword.  This almost precipitated a duel between Butler and Von Steuben.

At the victory dinner for his officers, George Washington raised his glass and toasted, "The Butlers and their five sons!"

Following Yorktown, Butler remained in the Continental Army and was transferred to the 3rd Pennsylvania following a consolidation of the Army on January 1, 1783.  On September 30 of the same year, he was breveted (i.e. an honorary promotion) as a brigadier general.  Butler remained in active service with the Continental Army until it was finally disbanded on November 3, 1783.

In 1783 Butler and his brothers became Original Members of the Pennsylvania Society of the Cincinnati, a military society of officers who had served in the Continental Army.

Post American Revolution activity
After the war, the Confederation Congress put Richard Butler in charge of Indians of the Northwest Territory.  He negotiated the Treaty of Fort Stanwix in 1784, in which the Iroquois surrendered their lands.  He was also called upon during later negotiations, such as the Treaty of Fort McIntosh in 1785.

Butler returned to Pennsylvania, and was a judge in Allegheny County.  He also served in the state legislature.  He married Maria Smith and had four children, only one of whom lived to have children and continue the line.  Butler also fathered a son, Captain Butler (or Tamanatha) with Shawnee chief Nonhelema.  Butler and his Shawnee son fought in opposing armies in 1791.

In 1791, Butler was commissioned a major general in the levies (i.e. militiamen conscripted into Federal service) under Major General Arthur St. Clair to fight against the Western Confederacy of Native Americans in the Northwest Territories (modern day Ohio).  He was killed in action on November 4, 1791 in St. Clair's Defeat at what is now Fort Recovery, Ohio.

Reportedly he was first buried on the battlefield, which site was then lost until it was accidentally found years later. The remains were laid to rest with the remains of the other fallen at Fort Recovery.

Legacy
Butler County, Ohio, where Fort Hamilton stood, is named for Richard Butler, as are Butler County, Kentucky, and Butler County, Pennsylvania.  The city of Butler, Pennsylvania and the General Richard Butler Bridge (located in the city of Butler) are also named for him.

A miniature portrait of Richard Butler was painted by "The Painter of The Revolution," Colonel John Trumbull, in 1790 and is in the collection of Yale University.

He is also honored in the name of General Richard Butler KYSAAR, Butler County, Kentucky recognized August 20, 2016.  A chapter of the Sons of the American Revolution is named for him as well as on in the Daughters of the American Revolution (DAR), the General Richard Butler Chapter, founded in Butler, Pennsylvania.

See also
 Thomas Butler (soldier)

Notes

References
 

 American Revolution Institute

1743 births
1791 deaths
American military personnel killed in the Northwest Indian War
Continental Army officers from Pennsylvania
American people of the Northwest Indian War
United States Army generals
People of colonial Pennsylvania
Irish soldiers in the United States Army
Kingdom of Ireland emigrants to the Thirteen Colonies